The Dukha, Dukhans or Duhalar (Tsaatan) are a small Tuvan (Tozhu Tuvans) Turkic community of semi-nomadic reindeer herders living in Khövsgöl, the northernmost province of Mongolia.

The name Tsaatan, which means ‘those who have reindeer’ in the Mongolian language, were originally Tuvinian reindeer herders.

Language 

The Dukhan language (SIL International dkh) is an endangered Turkic variety spoken by approximately five hundred people in the Tsagaan-Nuur county of the Khövsgöl region of northern Mongolia. Dukhan belongs to the Taiga subgroup of Sayan Turkic (Tuvan, Tofa).

History

Origin 
Originally from across the border in what is now Tuva Republic of Russia, the Dukha are one of the last groups of nomadic reindeer herders in the world. As the reindeer populations shrink, only about 40 families continue the tradition in the year 1998.

Settlement in northern Mongolia
Tuva became independent in 1921, when Mongolia gained its independence. At that time, the reindeer herders were able to cross the border freely between Tuva and Mongolia. However, when Tuva was annexed to the Soviet Union in 1944, the border was closed. In 1944, Russia was involved in World War II. So the Dukha people fled from Tuva to settle in Mongolia mainly for the following reasons:
 Since the border zone was their original territory, they had good trade relationships with the Mongolian herders in the Mongolian steppes. 
 There were food shortages in the Soviet Union due to World War II.
 Domestic animals were requisitioned by the Soviet government during the war.
 Many schoolchildren died from the spread of diseases they had little resistance to. 
 People were afraid of losing their domestic animals due to collectivization.
At first, the Mongolian government repeatedly deported them back to Tuva. In 1956 the government finally gave them Mongolian citizenship and resettled them at Tsagaan Nuur Lake on the Shishigt River.

Daily life

Reindeer use and management
The Dukha's sense of community is structured around the reindeer. The reindeer and the Dukha are dependent on one another. Some Dukha say that if the reindeer disappear, so too will their culture. The reindeer are domesticated and belong to the household. In many ways they are treated like family members and shown respect. The community's chores and activities center on the care and feeding of their reindeer. Dukha communities on the taiga are usually a group of tents of two to seven households that move camp to find optimum grazing for the reindeer. Herding tasks are shared amongst the camp with children at a young age learning to care for the reindeer and keeping them safe. The girls and younger women do the milking and make yogurt, cheese, and milk tea. Young men and women and elders help with herding. A few of the men stay with the reindeer in the winter months, living in the open air with their herds to protect them from wolves and other predators. The men also make and repair their hunting tools and reindeer saddles and carts. Since they rarely kill a reindeer, they supplement their diet of reindeer milk products by hunting wild animals from the forest.

Dukha raise their reindeer primarily for milk. Reindeer milk, reindeer yoghurt and reindeer cheese are the staples of the Dukha diet. The reindeer also provide transportation. Because the taiga area is typically hilly and covered with forest, reindeer are not used for pulling sledges, but for riding and as pack animals. They  take the Dukha for daily grazing, hunting, the collection of firewood, seasonal migrations, visiting relatives and friends, and traveling to the sum for shopping and trade. A 1.5 m long thin stick in the right hand is used as a whip. A rider gets on a tree stump and jumps onto the reindeer from the left side with the stick in the left hand, then transfers the stick to the right hand once the rider is mounted.

The Dukha begin training reindeer for riding when the reindeer (called  at this age) are two years old. Special training is not necessary to train the reindeer as pack animals. The male reindeer usually carry loads weighing about 40 kg (88 lbs.), while females carry up to 30 kg (66.1387 lbs.). 
Reindeer pelts are used for making winter coats. Bags, mats for traveling, and shoes are also made from the skin. Material for shoes is taken from the skin on the reindeer's shin. 
Reindeer antlers are ingredients in traditional Chinese medicine and have been supplied to China since 1975. During the summer, the antlers are cut off. The reindeer’s two front legs are tied to one hind leg to make the animal fall. The Dukha cut the antlers with a small saw. Because reindeer cannot properly regulate their body temperature when they lose their antlers and easily become exhausted, pregnant female reindeer never have their antlers removed.

Only a few reindeer are slaughtered during the year for meat and pelts.

Climate change has adversely effected the taiga inhabited by the Dukha and led to a decline in reindeer herds; lichen, an important food source for reindeer, is vulnerable to climactic changes.

Shelter
The Dukha live in ortz, yurts that resemble Native-Americans tepees. A large yurt may take birch bark from up to 32 trees to make; a medium-sized yurt is made from the bark of 23-25 trees.

Clothing
Dukha dress is characterized by hats like those of the Khalkh people, and wide deels (traditional Mongolian overcoats). They wear strong, warm boots fashioned from the hides and sinew of their reindeer.

Seasonal migration and residential groups
The Dukha are semi-nomadic. They move from one place to another without establishing any permanent settlements during the year. A residential group consisting of several families is called olal-lal (meaning ’them’ in the Tuva language). They usually refer to a specific group by the name of a representative member. Families of the same olal-lal set up tents close to one another (within a few kilometers) and collaborate in livestock herding.

Summer: Dukha move to their summer camp in the middle of June. Its altitude is around 2300 m, and there are fresh breezes. Because of the cold climate throughout the year, open grasslands spread across the high steppe. Reindeer cannot handle heat well, so they must be pastured in high plains in the summer.
Fall: The beginning of August is the time for Dukha families to move down to different camp sites to spend the fall season. When it begins to snow in mid-September, since there are no insects, the reindeer regain their vigor; and the young males are castrated. From the end of September to early October is mating season for reindeer. The gestation period for a reindeer is about seven months.
Winter: Dukha usually settle down in the deep forest at an altitude of about 1800 m where they can avoid the frigid winds. During winter camp, people remain in one area for a month at the longest, and then move on to another place, especially when there are wolves nearby. Snow is not an obstacle for reindeer to find and eat moss because they can dig in the snow with their hooves and find moss easily. Several residential groups band together and set out for "otor" (the herding of livestock by young men in distant areas). During otor, the reindeer are free to move about and can find moss and grass easily. It is common in winter for men to remain with reindeer herds and for women to remain in villages to oversee the education of children.
Spring: Groups cannot move as quickly to spring camps because they must accompany the pregnant female reindeer. This is the time when weather tends to be harsh, with strong winds, so they settle in a place that shelters them from severe winds. Reindeer give birth between late April and mid-May.

Belief and religion
According to a 2004 National Geographic report, the Dukha believe that their ancestors’ ghosts live on in the forest as animals that give guidance to the living,  Dukha people practise Shamanism, a religion based on nature worship. The Shamanistic practices among Dukha people differ from those of other Shamanistic religions in the region. Shaman worship among the Tsaatan people is thought to represent the oldest variant of Shamanism practiced by Mongolian nomads. Not only do they worship their Shaman, whom they call 'Boo', but they have many mystical holy books as well, and use many different treatises in their daily lives, including those for hunting and for calling or banishing the rain.

References

External links 
 National Geographic News "Reindeer People" Resort to Eating Their Herds", 2004
 Mongolia: Reindeer Culture Hangs On In The Far North, By Pearly Jacob, September 22, 2011
 Pictures of Mongolia's Reindeer People, National Geographic News
 Photos of Dukha family and their lifestyle By Hamid Sardar
 Brief Photo Introduction about Dukha/ Tsaatan Tribe in Northern Mongolia
 Short video about Tsaatan way of life, NBC News
 Reindeer Portal, Source of Information about Reindeer Husbandry Worldwide  "Tsaatan/Dukha"
 Meet Mongolian Reindeer Herders Fighting to Save Their Way of Life By Harrison Jacobs, Business Insider, May 23, 2014.
 “Reindeer People” to receive monthly allocation, The UB Post, May 14, 2013. 
 A precarious life in Mongolia’s north, BBC Travel story by Anna Kaminski, June 10, 2014.
 We are Dukha: This is the Way of Our People; The Totem People's Preservation Project
New York Times article, August 23, 2021

Tuvans
Ethnic groups in Mongolia
Khövsgöl Province